Władysław Niegolewski (1819, in Włościejewki – 1885) was a Polish liberal politician and member of Prussian House of Representatives, insurgent in Greater Poland Uprising 1846, Greater Poland Uprising 1848 and January Uprising 1863, cofounder of Central Economic Society (CTG) in 1861 and People's Libraries Society (TCL) in 1880.

See also
Central Economic Society for the Grand Duchy of Poznań (est. 1861, Polish: Centralne Towarzystwo Gospodarcze dla Wielkiego Księstwa Poznańskiego, CTG) - promotion of modern agriculture
People's Libraries Society (est.1880, Towarzystwo Czytelni Ludowych, TLC) promotion of education among the people

References

Witold Jakóbczyk, Przetrwać na Wartą 1815-1914, Dzieje narodu i państwa polskiego, vol. III-55, Krajowa Agencja Wydawnicza, Warszawa 1989

1819 births
1885 deaths
People from Śrem County
People from the Grand Duchy of Posen
Polish Party politicians
Members of the 1st Reichstag of the German Empire
Members of the 2nd Reichstag of the German Empire
Polish social activists of the Prussian partition
Members of the 4th Reichstag of the German Empire
People of the Revolutions of 1848
January Uprising participants
Poles - political prisoners in the Prussian partition
Polish deputies to the Reichstag in Berlin